Alfred Gustav Höchsmann  (1 July 1909 – 1978) was a Romanian handball player. He was a member of the Romania men's national handball team. He was a part of the  team at the 1936 Summer Olympics, playing three matches. On club level he played for Hermannstädter Turnverein in Romania.

Höchsmann was born in Sibiu to ethnic German parents, Adolf Johann Höchsmann and Johanna Höchsmann.

References

1978 deaths
Romanian male handball players
1909 births
Date of death missing
Field handball players at the 1936 Summer Olympics
Olympic handball players of Romania
Sportspeople from Sibiu
Romanian people of German descent